Beauverdia is a genus of South American plants in the  onion subfamily within Amaryllis family, native to Brazil, Uruguay, and Argentina. The plants are bulb-forming perennial herbs.

Affinities and classification of the species are unresolved at present, and require additional investigation. In 1972, genus Ipheion was divided into two sections, Hirtellum and Ipheion. However, the development of phylogenetic analysis revealed that Ipheion was not monophyletic, although the division into sections was later supported. Beauverdia Herter had been first described in 1943 as a genus with 10 species. Originally it was created to distinguish those species with single-flowered inflorescences from others with many-flowered inflorescences within Nothoscordum and other genera, some of them no longer considered members of the Amaryllidaceae. Some authors declined to regard the group as a distinct genus, preferring to consider the name a synonym of Ipheion. A number of species were transferred to other genera, including Nothoscordum and Tristagma.

In 2014, Beauverdia was again raised to genus rank and restored to the tribe, with four species.

Species
As of April 2015, the Kew World Checklist accepts the following:
Beauverdia dialystemon (Guagl.) Sassone & Guagl. -  Uruguay  
Beauverdia hirtella (Kunth) Herter - Argentina (Corrientes, Entre Ríos)
Beauverdia sellowiana (Kunth) Herter - Uruguay, Argentina (Entre Ríos)
Beauverdia vittata (Griseb.) Herter - Brazil (Rio Grande do Sul), Uruguay, Argentina (Entre Ríos)

formerly included
Species once regarded as members of Beauverdia but now (April 2015) considered better suited to Tristagma. 
 Beauverdia recurvifolia - Tristagma sessile 
 Beauverdia tweedieana - Tristagma tweedieanum 
 Beauverdia uniflora - Tristagma uniflorum

References

Amaryllidaceae genera
Allioideae
Flora of South America